Lisiczyn  is a settlement in the administrative district of Gmina Ruciane-Nida, within Pisz County, Warmian-Masurian Voivodeship, in northern Poland.

The settlement has a population of 15.

References

Lisiczyn